Nigel Anthony Fell Haworth (born 1951) is a New Zealand economics academic and politician. He was elected President of the New Zealand Labour Party in February 2015, succeeding Moira Coatsworth.

Education and academic career
Born in Wales in 1951, Haworth studied economics at the University of Liverpool, and completed a PhD there in 1982. He specialises in Latin American studies and the international labour market.

From 1978 to 1988, Haworth was a lecturer in industrial relations at the University of Strathclyde. He then emigrated to New Zealand to take up a post at the University of Auckland, becoming a professor in 1993. He was appointed head of the Department of Management and International Business in 2012 for a three-year term.

Politics
Haworth served as president of the Association of University Staff of New Zealand from 2005 to 2008. In 2012 he was elected as a member of the New Zealand Labour Party's policy council, and the following year he became a member of the Labour Party's New Zealand Council. He was elected to succeed Moira Coatworth as Labour Party President in 2015. 

In September 2019, Haworth resigned as Labour Party President in response to criticism over his handling of allegations of bullying, harassment, and sexual assault against a male Labour Party staffer. His resignation followed an allegation by a female Labour Party volunteer that she had been violently sexually assaulted by the male staffer. In December 2019, an independent review into the allegations of sexual assault, undertaken by Maria Dew QC on behalf of the Labour Party, found no sexual assaults nor instances of sexual harassment could be established. The Dew investigation cast major doubt over the allegations made by the principal complainant, who was also found to have been in a personal relationship with the respondent. Ms Dew concluded that the New Zealand Labour Party Code of Conduct and Harassment policies did not govern their personal relationship.

References

1951 births
Living people
Alumni of the University of Liverpool
Academics of the University of Strathclyde
Welsh emigrants to New Zealand
Academic staff of the University of Auckland
New Zealand Labour Party politicians